Chimborazo is a currently inactive stratovolcano in the Cordillera Occidental range of the Andes. Its last known eruption is believed to have occurred around 550 A.D.

Chimborazo's summit is the farthest point on the Earth's surface from the Earth's center, given that it is located along the planet's equatorial bulge. This is despite not being the tallest mountain in the Andes or on Earth. Based on the average global sea level, the height of Chimborazo is 6,263 m (20,548 ft), well below the height of Mount Everest (8849 metres). Nevertheless, Chimborazo is the highest mountain in Ecuador and the 39th highest peak in the Andes. 

Chimborazo is a popular destination for mountaineering as its climbing routes are considered challenging and take place on snow, ice, and rock, often requiring crampons and other technical climbing equipment.

Etymology
Several theories regarding the origin of the name Chimborazo exist. In many dialects of Quichua or Quechua, "chimba" means "on the other side" as in "on the other side of the river" or "on the opposite bank." Other dialects pronounce this word "chimpa." Also, "razu" means "ice" or "snow." Local Quichua speakers will say that Chimborazo is a Hispanicized pronunciation of "chimbarazu," meaning "the snow on the other side." Another theory suggests it is a combination of the Cayapa Schingbu for Women and the Colorado/Quichua Razo for Ice/Snow resulting in Women of Ice. According to another, Chimbo is Jívaro for Throne of Master/God resulting in Icethrone of God. The locals also used to call the mountain Urcurazu, with the Quichua Urcu for Mountain resulting in Mountain of Ice. In local indigenous mysticism, Chimborazo represents Taita (Father) whereas neighbouring Tungurahua is seen as Mama, and Guagua (Child) for Pichincha  hence Taita Chimborazo, Mama Tungurahua and Guagua Pichincha.

Geography

Location

The nearest cities are Riobamba (~30 km to the southeast), Ambato (~30 km to the northeast) and Guaranda (~25 km to the southwest). Chimborazo is surrounded by the Reserva de Producción Faunistica Chimborazo, which forms a protected ecosystem to preserve the habitat for the Andes native camelids of vicuña, llama and alpaca.

Chimborazo is at the main end of the Ecuadorian Volcanic Arc, north west of the town of Riobamba. Chimborazo is in la Avenida de los Volcanes (the Avenue of Volcanoes) west of the Sanancajas mountain chain. Carihuairazo, Tungurahua, Tulabug, and El Altar are all mountains that neighbor Chimborazo. There are many microclimates near Chimborazo, varying from desert in the Arenal to the humid mountains in the Abraspungo valley.

Glaciers

The top of Chimborazo is completely covered by glaciers, with some north-eastern glacier arms flowing down to 4,600 m. Its glacier is the source of water for the population of the Bolivar and Chimborazo provinces of Ecuador. Chimborazo glacier's ice mass has decreased over the past decades, which is thought to be in large part due to climate change, as well as ash cover from recent volcanic activity at Tungurahua, and the El Niño phenomenon.

As on other glaciated Ecuadorian mountains, Chimborazo's glacial ice is mined by locals (the so-called Hieleros from Spanish Hielo for Ice) to be sold in the markets of Guaranda and Riobamba. In earlier days, the people transported ice for cooling uses down to coastal towns such as Babahoyo or Vinces.

Elevation

Farthest point from Earth's center

The summit of Mount Everest is higher above sea level, but the summit of Chimborazo is widely reported to be the farthest point on the surface from Earth's center, with Huascarán a very close second.

The summit of Chimborazo is the fixed point on Earth that has the utmost distance from the center – because of the oblate spheroid shape of the planet Earth, which is thicker at the Equator than it is from pole to pole. Chimborazo is one degree south of the Equator and the Earth's diameter at the Equator is greater than at the latitude of Everest ( above sea level), nearly 27.6° north, with sea level also elevated. However, by height above sea level, Chimborazo is not the highest peak of the Andes.

Centrifugal force from the earth's rotation, and distance from the center of the earth, cause the force of gravity to be slightly reduced near the equator. The summit of Chimborazo has about one percent less gravity than the point with the highest gravitational force. Yet, due to its height above the surrounding terrain and local gravity anomalies, the summit of Huascarán is the place on Earth with the smallest gravitational force.

Geology
Chimborazo is an ice-capped inactive volcano. It is a double volcano composed of one volcanic edifice on top of another. Chimborazo shows four summits; Whymper, Veintimilla, Politecnica, and Nicolas Martínez. The Whymper peak is the highest point on the mountain at 6,263 meters. The volcano is categorized as a stratovolcano. This type of volcano is characterized as having low slopes at the bottom that gradually get steeper the higher up the mountain. Chimborazo's upper elevations are covered in glaciers that are decreasing in size due to climate change and falling ash from the nearby volcano, Tungurahua. In addition to the glaciers, the volcano is covered with craters. The volcano is dominantly andesitic to dacitic. This means that the lava is blocky, or flowing down the sides of the volcano, or somewhere in between.

Chimborazo is 73.5 metres  higher than the highest mountain in North America. Chimborazo is often associated with the nearby volcano Cotopaxi, although the two volcanoes have completely different structures.

Volcanism

Chimborazo is a dominantly andesitic-dacitic stratovolcano. About 35,000 years ago a collapse of Chimborazo produced a debris avalanche with an average thickness of forty meters, which underlies the city of Riobamba. It temporarily dammed the Río Chambo, causing an ephemeral lake.

Chimborazo then erupted several times during the Holocene, the last time around 550 AD ± 150 years. The eruptions after the collapse were primarily andesitic, or blocky, coagulated lava flow. These eruptions produced pyroclastic surges that went down as far as 3800 meters altitude. There have been at least seven eruptions in the past 10000 years. Chimborazo is officially considered inactive, but studies show that there may be an eruption in the future. The average time between eruptions for Chimborazo is 1,000 years, and the last eruption was 1,400 years ago.

Surveys and expeditions

Until the beginning of the 19th century, it was thought that Chimborazo was the highest mountain on Earth (measured from sea level), and such reputation led to many attempts on its summit during the 17th and 18th centuries.

In 1746, the volcano was explored by French academicians from the French Geodesic Mission. Their mission was to determine the sphericity of the Earth. Their work along with another team in Lapland established that the Earth was an oblate spheroid rather than a true sphere. They did not reach the summit of Chimborazo.

In June 1802, during his expedition to South America, the Prussian-born traveler Alexander von Humboldt, accompanied by the French botanist Aimé Bonpland and the Ecuadorian Carlos Montúfar, tried to reach the summit. From his description of the mountain, it seems that before he and his companions had to return suffering from altitude sickness they reached a point at 5,875 m, higher than previously attained by any European in recorded history (Incans had reached much higher altitudes previously; see Llullaillaco). In 1831, Jean-Baptiste Boussingault and Colonel Hall reached a new "highest point", estimated to be 6,006 m. Other failed attempts to reach the summit followed.
	
On 4 January 1880, the English climber Edward Whymper reached the summit of Chimborazo. The route that Whymper took up the mountain is now known as the Whymper route. As there were many critics who doubted that Whymper had reached the summit, later in the same year he climbed to the summit again, choosing a different route (Pogyos) with the Ecuadorians David Beltrán and Francisco Campaña.

SAETA Flight 232
In August 1976, SAETA Flight 232 carrying 55 passengers and four crew members aboard a Vickers Viscount from Quito to Cuenca disappeared en route. In February 2003, after almost 27 years, the aircraft was found with the bodies of its 59 occupants at  elevation on Chimborazo by Ecuadorian climbers on the rarely used eastern route Integral.

Mountaineering

As Ecuador's highest mountain, Chimborazo is a very popular climb and can be climbed year round with the best seasons being December–January and July–August.

Routes 
The easiest (IFAS Grade: PD) and most climbed routes are the Normal and the Whymper route. Both are western ridge routes starting at the Whymper hut and leading via the Ventemilla summit to the main (Whymper) summit.
There are several other less used and more challenging routes on the mountain's other faces and ridges leading to one of Chimborazo's summits: Main (Whymper, Ecuador), Politecnico (Central), N. Martinez (Eastern). The mountain is contained on the IGM (Instituto Geografico Militar) 1:50000 Map Chimborazo (CT-ÑIV-C1).

Huts
There are two functioning huts, the Carrel Hut (4,850 m) and the nearby Whymper Hut (5,000 m). The Carrel Hut can be reached by car from Riobamba, Ambato or Guaranda. On the north-west side there is the now defunct Zurita hut (4,900 m), which served as base for the Pogyos route.

Climbing
El Castillo is the most popular route up the volcano. This route is usually climbed December to February and June to September. This route involves climbing the west side of the volcano. The route starts at Whymper hut to a saddle above El Castillo. From the saddle, there is a glacier ridge. Then climbers go to the Veintemilla summit. Veintemilla summit is often the turnaround point for climbers. There is a 30-minute snow-filled basin between Veintemilla summit and Whymper summit. Whymper summit is the highest point of the mountain. The El Castillo route takes around eight to twelve hours to ascend and about three to five hours to descend. Climbing Chimborazo is dangerous due to the risk of avalanches, the severe weather conditions, and the fact that it is covered in glaciers. Climbing begins at night in order to reach the summit before sunrise when the snow melts, which increases the chance of avalanche and rockfall.

The climb itself demands skill. The climb is often on black ice, so crampons and other technical climbing equipment are required. On November 10, 1993 three parties of climbers, one ascending and two descending, were caught in an avalanche on the steep slopes below the Veintimilla summit. These climbers comprised six French, two Ecuadorians, one Swiss, and one Chilean. After the ten climbers were buried in snow, it took twenty people and ten days to find their bodies. This was considered the worst climbing accident in Ecuador.

Cultural references
 Chimborazo is featured on the Ecuadorian coat of arms, to represent the beauty and richness of the Ecuadorian Sierra (Highlands).
 Simón Bolívar's poem, "Mi delirio sobre el Chimborazo", was inspired by the mountain.
 In his central essay "The Poet", Ralph Waldo Emerson uses the Chimborazo as metaphor for the poet (and the creative genius in general), who "must stand out of our low limitations".
 Walter J. Turner's poem "Romance" contains the couplet "Chimborazo, Cotopaxi/They had stolen my soul away!"
 The American landscape painter Frederick Edwin Church features the Chimborazo in the background of his famous work The Heart of the Andes (1859) as well as in his painting Chimborazo (1864).
 Miguel Ángel León wrote a poem entitled "Canto al Chimborazo" (Song to Chimborazo).
 David Weber's novel The Armageddon Inheritance mentions Mount Chimborazo as the site for a massive planetary defense installation.

See also

Lists of volcanoes
List of volcanoes in Ecuador
List of mountains in the Andes
List of Ultras of South America
List of mountains in Ecuador

Notes

References

External links

 
 
 

Mountains of Ecuador
Stratovolcanoes of Ecuador
Geography of Chimborazo Province
Andean Volcanic Belt
Extreme points of Earth
Glaciers of Ecuador
Pleistocene stratovolcanoes
Quaternary South America
Tourist attractions in Chimborazo Province
Highest points of countries
Six-thousanders of the Andes
Climbing areas of Ecuador
Holocene stratovolcanoes